John Benedict Chitambar (1920-2005) was an Indian  educator at the Allahabad Agricultural Institute.

Early life and background 
Chitambar was born in Lucknow, India. He received his doctorate in rural sociology from Cornell University.

Career 
After independence of India, he moved to the Allahabad Agricultural Institute, where he served for 31 years initially in the Department of Extension and then as principal until retirement.

He relocated to the United States in 1981, where he worked with World Vision International for 10 years as a director of rural development and agriculture. He published numerous papers and three textbooks in his field of rural sociology.

Books published
 Introductory Rural Sociology
 Practical Rural Sociology Handbook for Application to Rural Development
 Introductory to Rural Sociology A Synopsis of Concepts and Principles

References

1920 births
2005 deaths
Sam Higginbottom University of Agriculture, Technology and Sciences alumni
Cornell University alumni
Rural sociologists
Indian sociologists
Indian emigrants to the United States